In the Netherlands the Treasurer-General (Dutch: thesaurier-generaal) is the head of the General Treasury, part of the Ministry of Finance. The holder of the office has a deputy and is a member of the board of directors of the finance ministry.

List of recent Treasurers-General

References

External link